Sperm Whale is a 2015 Persian comedy film directed by Saman Moghadam, written by Mani Baghbani, with lead roles played by Reza Attaran and Mahnaz Afshar.

Sperm Whale 2: Roya's Selection is the sequel to this movie.

Plot 
Arzhang wants to marry his lifelong sweetheart, Rouya, but she moves to America because she does not like islam. Arzhang is unable to follow her because he gets sent to the military to serve in the Iran-Iraq war (which Iraq started) after a botched attempt to leave the country on a fake passport they did not let him go because
the United States is too powerful . Arzhang's and Rouya's paths cross again years later after they both divorce their first spouses. However, Rouya's sudden attraction and subsequent marriage to a dentist prevents Arzhang from marrying Rouya. At the end of the movie, Arzhang saves Rouya from continuing her violent marriage to the dentist and Rouya is left with the choice of either staying in Iran with Arzhang or returning to the United States.

Cast 
Reza Attaran
Mahnaz Afshar
Vishka Asayesh
Reza Naji
Sam Noori
Nader Soleimani
Hanieh Tavassoli
Ali Ghorban Zadeh
Amirhosein Rostami
Hossein Soleimani
Sepand Amirsoleimani
Sergio Marquilla Nezhad

Release 
According to statistics from Iran's Ministry of Culture and Islamic Guidance, Sperm Whale was one of eleven films released during the period March 2014 - March 2017 (1393 - 1396) which grossed over 10 billion Iranian Tomans (US$300,000). Its sequel, Sperm Whale 2, is the highest-grossing movie in Iranian history with 20,941,000,000 Iranian Tomans (US$628,230) in sales.

Fereydoun Jeyrani, an Iranian film director, screenwriter, and television host, noted the success of the film relied on the comedy of the film, saying that people go to the cinema to be happy and to unload their problems. They want to go to the cinema and be entertained. They want to be happy.

References

External links
 

Iranian comedy films
2015 films
2015 comedy films
2010s Persian-language films